The Sarah Palin interviews with Katie Couric were a series of interviews of the 2008 U.S. Republican vice presidential nominee Sarah Palin conducted by CBS Evening News anchor Katie Couric. They were recorded and broadcast on television in several programs before the 2008 U.S. presidential election. Couric received the Alfred I. duPont–Columbia University Award and the Walter Cronkite Award for Journalism Excellence for the interview.

The interviews were widely seen as a disaster for Palin's image and for the McCain campaign, and were cited by many as the cause of a turning of the tide of public opinion against her.

Origins
The Couric interview was preceded by heavy media scrutiny over the McCain campaign's alleged unwillingness to allow press access to Palin.

Palin's account in her memoirs states that Nicolle Wallace, a senior McCain staffer, pushed for Couric and the CBS Evening News. "The campaign's general strategy involved coming out with a network anchor, someone they felt had treated John well on the trail thus far. My suggestion was that we be consistent with that strategy and start talking to outlets like FOX and the Wall Street Journal. I really didn't have a say in which press I was going to talk to, but for some reason Nicolle seemed compelled to get me on the Katie bandwagon," wrote Palin.

"Katie really likes you," Wallace said according to Palin. "She's a working mom and admires you as a working mom. She has teenage daughters like you. She just relates to you. ... Believe me, I know her very well. I've worked with her. ... She just has such low self-esteem. ... She just feels she can't trust anybody. She wants you to like her. You know what? We'll schedule a segment with her, if it doesn't go well, if there's no chemistry, we won't do any others."

Wallace disputed Palin's account. "The whole notion there was a conversation where I tried to cajole her into a conversation with Katie [Couric] is fiction". Wallace earlier had praised the channel, "We had no input on usage ... we had no ground rules on the interview. I think that's pretty unprecedented. A lot of people negotiate platforms. We didn't negotiate platforms or air dates."

"We were initially supposed to interview her—sit down with her in Philadelphia on Sunday and travel with Senator McCain and Governor Palin on that Monday," Couric recalled. "And then the campaign felt they didn't want a week to go by without hearing anything from Governor Palin because they were doling out the interviews very selectively. So they decided when she was visiting some world leaders at the UN, that that would be an opportunity for her to sit down that morning and talk to me and it was very serendipitous for us, because we could—that opened the door to a lot of interesting foreign policy questions. And, also, in addition to that, the financial crisis was sort of really heating up during that week, so that was another opportunity. Then, we had scheduled an interview the following Monday, during which we were going to talk about a lot of domestic and social issues, so they gave us tremendous access."

Newsweek reported that at the time of the Couric interview, Palin felt that she had been overmanaged for her first one-on-one debut with a network anchor, Charlie Gibson of ABC, and "rebuffed Wallace's help with her Couric interview." McCain advisers said that Palin "did not have the time or focus to prepare for the interview." "She did not say, 'I will not prepare,'" a McCain adviser said. "She just didn't have a bandwidth to do a mock interview session the way we had prepared before. She was just overloaded."

Format
CBS News producers segmented key moments from the interviews over the course of several days and on multiple formats, including The Early Show, the Evening News, and the Internet. The New York Observer noted that this "prolonged the interviews' saliency in the news cycle," and Bill Kristol, a Fox News Channel commentator who was a prominent supporter of Palin, referred to the network's "seemingly never-ending installments" as a "nine-thousand-part interview."

The initial 40-minute session aired September 24 and 25, 2008. Palin and Couric discussed Rick Davis and the economy. Palin defended her comments on how Alaska's proximity to Russia enhanced her foreign policy experience:

Couric asked Palin her opinion on the emergency economic bailout the Bush administration was proposing:

In another segment aired on September 30, Couric asked Palin about her taste in periodicals:

Fallout
The interviews aired on CBS Evening News showed ratings increases on both nights and clips posted on YouTube garnered more than 10 million views. National Review editor Rich Lowry called Palin's performance in the interview "dreadful." The New York Times television critic Alessandra Stanley described the interview as "in some ways ... the worst" interview Palin had done. The exchange on Russia was "startling," her answer "surprisingly wobbly." While it's "perhaps understandable" that Palin "felt nervous," it still "wasn't a reassuring performance." Beliefnet's Rod Dreher wrote that he was "well and truly embarrassed" for Palin. She's "a good woman who might well be a great governor of Alaska," but this was a "train wreck."

The interviews were later parodied on Saturday Night Live, with Tina Fey as Palin. While helping Seth Meyers write the sketch, Fey decided to use Palin's answer regarding her opinion on the bank bailout nearly verbatim. Fey later said on the Late Show with David Letterman that, in answering that question, Palin "got lost in a corn maze," noticeably struggling to find an answer and meandering between several seemingly unrelated topics such as health care, job creation, lowering government spending, international trade, and lowering taxes, ultimately not stating a clear position for or against it.

CNN commentator Jack Cafferty was particularly critical of Palin's answer to the bailout question, saying that if McCain wins, Palin will be "one 72-year-old's heartbeat away from being President of the United States, and if that doesn't scare the hell out of you, it should" and that in all his years of covering politics, "that was one of the most pathetic pieces of tape I have ever seen from someone aspiring to one of the highest offices in this country." The airing of the Couric interviews coincided with a collapse in her approval ratings and a loss of McCain's gains among white women.

In the immediate aftermath of the interview, Palin voiced irritation she had with Couric's interview:

Palin also criticized Couric's question on what newspapers and magazines she read:

According to campaign manager Rick Davis, Palin thought the questions would be softer than they were: "She was under the impression the Couric thing was going to be easier than it was. Everyone's guard was down for the Couric interview." "I knew it didn't go well the first day, and then we gave her a couple of other segments after that," Palin said in a retrospective with conservative filmmaker John Ziegler on the Couric interview. "My question to the campaign was, after it didn't go well the first day, why were we going to go back for more? Because of however it works in that upper echelon of power brokering, in the media and with spokespersons, it was told [to] me, yeah, we're going to go back for more. And going back for more was not a wise decision, either."

After the election, Couric appeared on the Late Show with David Letterman and discussed her interviews with Palin, especially in regard to her question on what newspapers or magazines she read to "stay informed and to understand the world":

Palin directly responded to that question in Ziegler's interview,

Because, Katie, you're not the center of everybody's universe, maybe that's why they didn't think to ask that question among so many other things to be asked. To me the question was more along the lines of: Do you read? What do you guys do up there? What is it that you read? And perhaps I was just too flippant in my answer back to her ...

Ziegler has called the awarding of the Walter Cronkite award to Couric an "outrage." "What really happened here is that Katie Couric showed Governor Palin that she had an agenda on the abortion issue," Ziegler said.

She kept coming back to it time and time again, obviously trying to trap Governor Palin into saying something stupid or extreme. Everything after that has to be seen in the context of that episode, because Governor Palin never trusted Katie Couric after that. It is very, very obvious that Katie Couric had an agenda and that she is being rewarded for having pursued that agenda.

On the other hand, former Republican presidential candidate Mike Huckabee defended Couric, "Now I must say I did not think that ... the Katie Couric interviews were unfair. In fact, if anything, Katie Couric was extraordinarily gentle, even helpful. [Palin] just ... I don't know what happened. I can't explain it. It was not a good interview. I'm being charitable."

Steve Schmidt, McCain's senior campaign strategist and advisor, later reflected on the interview, first by defending Couric by saying that there were no "gotcha questions" or "unfair questions," and then added, "I think it was the most consequential interview from a negative perspective that a candidate for national office has gone through, not since Roger Mudd interviewed Ted Kennedy in the late 1970s." This interview was notable for Kennedy's vague and incoherent response to the question of "[w]hy do you want to be President?" which some say derailed Kennedy's presidential ambitions.

Accepting the Walter Cronkite Award for Special Achievement for National Impact on the 2008 Campaign, Couric said,

I believe one of the reasons that the interview I conducted with Sarah Palin was so impactful is because it wasn't done through any particular ideological prism. I was so mindful of my personal affect, knowing every head tilt, expression, and follow-up question would be carefully dissected for any evidence of bias. My goal was simply to be a conduit to allow her to express her views and give those watching a chance to come to their own conclusions.

Later remarks
In November 2010, Palin ruled out ever granting Couric another interview. Palin said she would not be willing to have an interview "with a reporter who already has such a bias against whatever it is that I would come out and say? Why waste my time? No. ... So a journalist, a reporter who is so biased and will, no doubt, spin and gin up whatever it is that I have to say to create controversy, I swear to you, I will not my waste my time with her. Or him."

In April 2012, Palin temporarily assumed Couric's old job as Today Show co-host for the April 3rd show, competing with Couric's week-long run as host of Good Morning America.

In November 2015, Palin was asked about her response to Couric's question about her news sources. Palin said:

I had a crappy answer. But it was a fair question. I didn't like, though, the way that, forever then in these seven years, that interview has kind of been stamped on my forehead as, 'she's an idiot.' I just think, in the context of the whole ball of wax that day—or two days—of an interview and editing, it wasn't real fun.

References

Palin interviews
Palin interviews
Palin
Palin
Interviews
September 2008 events in the United States
Palin interviews